Maen, Maoin,  Maon or Main), son of Óengus Olmucaid, who, according to medieval legend and tradition, was a High King of Ireland.  Óengus Olmucaid in turn was the son of Fíachu Labrainne.

His Son was Rothechtaid mac Main, who according to medieval legend and tradition, was a High King of Ireland.

Legendary Irish kings